Te Pūoho-o-te-rangi (died 1836 or 1837) was a notable New Zealand tribal leader. A Māori, he identified with the Ngāti Tama and Ngāti Toa iwi. Te Pūoho was born in Poutama, Taranaki, New Zealand, possibly in the late eighteenth century. Late in his life, he moved to the South Island and settled at Parapara.

In 1836, Te Pūoho led a 100-person war party, armed with muskets, down the West Coast and over the Haast Pass / Tioripatea: they fell on the Ngāi Tahu encampment between Lake Wānaka and Lake Hāwea, capturing ten people and killing and eating two children. Some of the Ngāi Tahu fled down the Waitaki River to the coast; Te Pūoho took his captives over the Crown Range to Lake Wakatipu and thence to Southland where he was killed and his war party destroyed by the southern Ngāi Tahu leader Tūhawaiki.

References

Ngāti Tama people
Ngāti Toa people
Year of birth missing
1836 deaths
New Zealand Māori soldiers
People from Taranaki